The Dalkon Shield was a contraceptive intrauterine device (IUD) developed by the  Dalkon Corporation and marketed by the A.H. Robins Company. The Dalkon Shield was found to cause severe injury to a disproportionately large percentage of women, which eventually led to numerous lawsuits, in which juries awarded millions of dollars in compensatory and punitive damages.

History 

Hugh J. Davis, M.D., a physician, and Irwin Lerner, an electrical engineer, invented and applied for a patent for the Dalkon Shield in 1968. In 1970, the A.H. Robins Company acquired the Dalkon Shield from the Dalkon Corporation, founded by Davis. The Dalkon Corporation had only four shareholders: the inventors Davis and Lerner, their attorney Robert Cohn, and Thad J. Earl, M.D., a medical practitioner in Defiance, Ohio. In January 1971, Dalkon Shield went into the market, beginning in the United States and Puerto Rico, spearheaded by a large marketing campaign. At its peak, about 2.8 million women used the Dalkon Shield in the U.S.

At the time of its introduction, the Dalkon Shield was promoted as a safer alternative compared to birth control pills, which at the time were the subject of many safety concerns. Dr. Davis himself was a participant in the 1970 Nelson hearings, which were congressional hearings led by Senator Gaylord Nelson regarding the safety of oral contraceptives. He asserted that oral contraceptives with high doses of hormones were dangerous and that the efficacy of the pill was "greatly overrated."

Design flaw 

A string composed of hundreds of nylon monofilaments enclosed within a nylon sheath was tied to the Dalkon Shield. The string tended to harbor bacteria and to deteriorate inside the body; it conducted bacteria through the cervix into the uterus, bypassing the cervical mucus which normally acts as a barrier against infection.

Initial reports in the medical literature raised questions about whether its efficacy in preventing pregnancy and expulsion rate were as good as those claimed by the manufacturer, but failed to detect the tendency of the device to cause septic abortion and other severe infections.

Infections 

In June 1973, the Centers for Disease Control and Prevention (CDC) conducted a survey of 34,544 physicians with practices in gynecology or obstetrics regarding women who had been hospitalized or had died with complications related to the use of an IUD in the previous 6 months. A total of 16,994 physicians responded, yielding 3,502 unique case reports of women hospitalized in the first 6 months of 1973. Based on the survey response rate, the CDC estimated that a total of 7,900 IUD-related hospitalizations occurred during this 6-month period. Based on an estimate of 3.2 million IUD users, the CDC estimated an annual device-related hospitalization rate of 5 per 1000 IUD users. The survey also provided 5 reports of device-related fatalities, with four of these related to severe infection. One of the five was associated with the Dalkon Shield. Based on these data, the CDC estimated an IUD-related fatality rate of 3 per million users per year of use, which it compared favorably to the mortality risks associated with pregnancy and other forms of contraception. Importantly, the survey showed that the Dalkon Shield was associated with an increased rate of pregnancy-associated complications leading to hospitalization.

By 1974, approximately 2.5 million women had received the Dalkon intrauterine device. In June of that year, the medical director of A.H. Robins published a letter to the editor of the British Medical Journal stating that the company was aware of an "apparent increase in the number of cases of septic abortions" including 4 fatalities, but stating that "there is no evidence of a direct cause-and-effect relationship between wearing of the Dalkon Shield and the occurrence of septicemia". The letter recommended precautions including pregnancy tests for women who missed their period and the immediate removal of the device in women who were found to be pregnant. That same month, A.H. Robins suspended sales of the device in the United States at the urging of the Food and Drug Administration. In October 1974, a series of four case reports of septic pregnancies were published in the journal Obstretics and Gynecology. In 1975, the CDC published a study associating the Dalkon Shield with a higher risk of spontaneous abortion-related death compared to other IUDs.

As many as 200,000 women made claims against the A.H. Robins company, mostly related to claims associated with pelvic inflammatory disease and loss of fertility. The company eventually filed for bankruptcy. The company's representatives argued that pelvic infections have a wide variety of causes, and that the Dalkon Shield was no more dangerous than other forms of birth control. Lawyers for the plaintiffs argued that the women they represented would be healthy and fertile today if not for the device. Scientists from the CDC stated that both arguments have merit.

Aftermath 
More than 300,000 lawsuits were filed against the A.H. Robins Company – the largest tort liability case since asbestos.  The federal judge, Miles W. Lord, attracted public commentary for his judgments, impositions of personal liability, and public rebukes of the company heads. The cost of litigation and settlements (estimated at billions of dollars) led the company to file for Chapter 11 bankruptcy protection in 1985. As a result, Robins sold the company to American Home Products (now Wyeth). 

In 1976, the Medical Device Amendments to the Food, Drug, and Cosmetic Act mandated the U.S. Food and Drug Administration, for the first time, to require testing and approval of "medical devices", including IUDs.

The Dalkon Shield became infamous for its serious design flaw: a porous, multifilament string upon which bacteria could travel into the uterus of users, leading to sepsis, injury, miscarriage, and death. Modern intrauterine devices (IUDs) use monofilament strings, which do not pose this grave risk to users.

References

Bibliography

  – Chronicles legal team of Brown & Szaller's involvement in the Dalkon Shield Litigation.
 
 
 
  – Dissertation

Books 

 
 
 
 
 
 
 Abstract:  – Includes full text of presiding judge Miles Lord's statement to Clairbone Robins, et al., at bottom.
 Reviewed and summarised by: 
 
 
 

Intrauterine contraception
Lawsuits
Product liability
Products introduced in 1971